Sir James Henderson (28 April 1846 – 1 May 1914) was an Irish Unionist politician, who served as Lord Mayor of Belfast. He served in this role between 1898 and 1899. He was also the first High Sheriff of Belfast.

Born in Belfast on 28 April 1846, he read law at Trinity College Dublin and was called to the Irish bar in 1872. He was knighted in the 1899 New Year Honours. He was married to Martha Pollock, and they had five sons. He died on 1 May 1914 and is buried in Belfast City Cemetery.

Arms

References

1846 births
1924 deaths
Knights Bachelor
Lord Mayors of Belfast
High Sheriffs of Belfast
Ulster Unionist Party councillors
Alumni of Trinity College Dublin
Irish businesspeople
Irish barristers
Mayors of Belfast
Alumni of King's Inns
Burials at Belfast City Cemetery